An animalier is an artist, mainly from the 19th century, who specializes in, or is known for, skill in the realistic portrayal of animals. "Animal painter" is the more general term for earlier artists.  Although the work may be in any genre or format, the term is most often applied to sculptors and painters.

Animalier as a collective plural noun, or animalier bronzes, is also a term in antiques for small-scale sculptures of animals, of which large numbers were produced, often mass-produced, primarily in 19th-century France and to a lesser extent elsewhere in continental Europe.

Although many earlier examples can be found, animalier sculpture became more popular, and reputable, in early 19th-century Paris with the works of Antoine-Louis Barye (1795–1875), for whom the term was coined, derisively, by critics in 1831, and of Émile-Coriolan Guillemin. By the mid-century, a taste for animal subjects was very widespread among all sections of the middle classes.

Prominent animaliers

Painters
 Richard Ansdell
 Nicasius Bernaerts
 Jean-Baptiste Berré
 Pieter Boel
 Rosa Bonheur
 Jacques Raymond Brascassat
 Pieter Casteels III
 David de Coninck
 Alexandre-François Desportes
 Jan Fyt
 Jacob van der Kerckhoven
 Carstian Luyckx
 Jean-Baptiste Oudry
 Melchior d'Hondecoeter
 Charles Jacque
 Paul Jouve
 Edwin Landseer
 Frans Snyders
 Julia Wernicke

Sculptors

 Silvio Apponyi
 Carl Akeley
 Alphonse-Alexandre Arson
 Alfred Barye
 Antoine-Louis Barye
 André-Vincent Becquerel
 Jean-Baptiste Berré
 Joseph Edgar Boehm
 Antoine Bofill
 Isidore Bonheur
 Rosa Bonheur
 Solon Borglum
 Antoine-Félix Bouré
 Rembrandt Bugatti 
 Auguste Cain
 Victor Chemin
 Paul Comolèra
 Joseph Csaky
 Paul-Édouard Delabrièrre
 Alfred Dubucand
 Ivan Efimov
 Anton Dominik Fernkorn
 Christopher Fratin
 Emmanuel Frémiet
 Georges Gardet
 August Gaul
 Raymond Gayrard
 Thomas Gechter
 Robert Glassby
 Willis Good
 Émile-Coriolan Guillemin
 Anna Hyatt Huntington
 Herbert Haseltine
 Gaston d'Illiers
 Henri Alfred Jacquemart
 Bohumil Kafka
 Edward Kemeys
 Albert Laessle
 Gertrude Lathrop
 Prosper Lecourtier
 Pierre Lenordez
 Edouard Martinet
 Clovis Edmond Masson
 Pierre-Jules Mêne
 Léon Mignon
 Jules Moigniez
 Auguste Ottin
 Charles Paillet
 Daniel Parker
 Ferdinand Pautrot
 Jules Pautrot
 François Pompon
 Edward Clark Potter
 Alexander Phimister Proctor
 Louis Riche
 Frederick Roth
 Pierre Louis Rouillard
 Edouard-Marcel Sandoz
 Auguste Trémont
 Paul Troubetzkoy
 Pierre-Nicolas Tourgueneff
 Charles Valton 
 Vasily Vatagin
 Katharine Lane Weems

References

External links

 Animalier
Antiques
19th century in art